Brian King may refer to:
 Brian King (bishop) (1938–2006), assistant bishop in the Anglican Diocese of Sydney
 Brian King (murder victim), 14-year-old murdered by Jason Massey in 1993
 Brian King (writer), American screenwriter and director
 Brian King (politician), member of the Utah House of Representatives